Eduardo Martínez Fajardo (14 August 1924 – 4 July 2019) was a Spanish film actor born in Meis (Pontevedra), Spain. He appeared in 183 films, 75 plays and made 2,000 television appearances between 1947 and 2002.

Biography
He was born in Meis, Pontevedra on 14 August 1924, and he raised in Haro and Santander, where he studied Bachillerato. He began his career as a voice actor from 1942 to 1946, and in 1947 he made his film debut in Héroes del 95, directed by Raúl Alfonso. In the 1950s he moved to Mexico, and when he came back to Spain he appeared in spaghetti westerns such as Gli eroi di Fort Worth (1965) by Martin Herbert, and Django (1966) by Sergio Corbucci.

In 2002, he founded Teatro sin barreras in Almeria, in order to help people with disabilities. He started the Almeria Walk of Fame, where he received a star on 11 April 2012 due to his intervention in 7th Cavalry and Django.

Personal life and death
Fajardo was married four times. In Mexico he married twice, one of her with the actress Carmelita González, with whom he bore a daughter, Paloma del Rocío. His others children are José Antonio, Corazón, Lucero, Dusko, Alma and Eduardo.

Fajardo died while vacationing with five of his seven children in Mexico on 4 July 2019 at the age of 94.

Awards
He was honoured by the Diputación de Pontevedra and had been named hijo predilecto del Concello de Meis. In January 2019 he was honoured by the Almería Western Museo del Cine.

Selected filmography

 Héroes del 95 (1947) – Enrique de Mendoza
 Dulcinea (1947) – Ginés de la Hera
 La nao Capitana (1947) – Soldier (uncredited)
 Lady in Ermine (1947) – Don Luis Tristán
 The Princess of the Ursines (1947) – Capitán emisario
 Fuenteovejuna (1947) – Soldado
 2 cuentos para 2 (1947) – Franklin Perry
 Don Quijote de la Mancha (1947) – Don Fernando
 Amanhã Como Hoje (1948) – Capitão
 Madness for Love (1948) – Marqués de Villena
 Mare Nostrum (1948) – Capitán
 The Captain from Loyola (1949)
 Currito de la Cruz (1949) – Man at bullring (uncredited)
 Noche de Reyes (1949)
 Just Any Woman (1949) – Ricardo
 The Duchess of Benameji (1949) – Carlos, Marqués de Miraflores
 ¡El santuario no se rinde! (1949) – Teniente Ramos
 Paz (1949) – Voz en radio (voice, uncredited)
 El sótano (1949) – Juan Bell
 Tempestad en el alma (1950)
 Woman to Woman (1950) – Luis
 Agustina of Aragon (1950) – Luis Montana
 Tres ladrones en la casa (1950) – Felipe
 Vendaval (1950) – Coronel Puig Moltó
 Reckless (1951) – Mario Santos
 The Lioness of Castille (1951) – Tovar
 Dawn of America (1951) – Gastón
 Cerca de la ciudad (1952) – Antonio
 Gloria Mairena (1952) – Paulino Céspedes
 The Curious Impertinent (1953) – Bocaccio
 Airport (1953) – Espectador (uncredited)
 La intrusa (1954) – Raúl Gómez de Fonseca
 Tehuantepec (1954)
 La engañadora (1955)
 Orgullo de mujer (1956) – Ramón Durán
 Tizoc (1957) – Arturo
 La ciudad de los niños (1957) – Señor Jaime Andrade
 Las últimas banderas (1957)
 Escuela de rateros (1958) – Eduardo, ladrón de joyas
 Macario (1960) – Virrey
 La Llorona (1960) – Don Nuño de Montes Claros
 Ánimas Trujano (1961) – El Español
 Los invisibles (1963) – Jewel Thief
 Las hijas del Zorro (1964)
 Canción del alma (1964) – Alejandro
 Las invencibles (1964)
 I due toreri (1965) – Ispettore N.B.
 Vengeance of the Vikings (1965) – Olaf
 Heroes of Fort Worth (1965) – Col. George Bonnet
 A Coffin for the Sheriff (1965) – Russell Murdock
 Ringo's Big Night (1966) – Joseph Finley
 La ciudad no es para mí (1966) – Dr. Agustín Valverde hijo
 Django (1966) – Major Jackson
 Agent 3S3: Massacre in the Sun (1966) – Professor Theodore Karleston
 Pas de panique (1966) – Lorenzaccio
 Missione apocalisse (1966) – Axel
 Ringo, the Mark of Vengeance (1966) – Tim
 Trap for Seven Spies (1966) – Colonnello Riteau
 El aventurero de Guaynas (1966)
 Master Stroke (1967) – Mr. Ferrington
 Argoman the Fantastic Superman (1967) – Shandra, butler
 Seven Pistols for a Massacre (1967) – Tilly
 Come rubare un quintale di diamanti in Russia (1967) – Gen. Poniatowski
 Il tempo degli avvoltoi (1967) – Don Jaime Mendoza
 Gentleman Killer (1967) – Colonel Fernando Ferreras
 Killer Adios (1968) – Sam Ringold
 Cover Girl (1968) – Maurice Behar
 Pistol for a Hundred Coffins (1968) – Acombar
 Los flamencos (1968) – Kuis
 Go for Broke (1968) – Paco Nuñez
 A Stroke of 1000 Millions (1968) – Teopulos
 Pistol for a Hundred Coffins (1968) – Chavel, Madman
 Uno a uno, sin piedad (1968) – Sheriff Lyman
 The Mercenary (1968) – Alfonso García
 No le busques tres pies... (1968) – Juan
 Tiempos de Chicago (1969) – Captain Harper
 Pagó cara su muerte (1969) – Trevor
 Bootleggers (1969) – Sir Louis Baymond
 El taxi de los conflictos (1969) – Comisario Diéguez
 Sharon vestida de rojo (1969) – Matthews
 Eagles Over London (1969) – German officer
 Cry Chicago (1969) – Dick O'Connor
 Cuatro noches de boda (1969) – Miguel
 Las nenas del mini-mini (1969) – Padre de Chalo
 Homicidios en Chicago (1969) – Arthur
 El perfil de Satanás (1969) – Staub
 El mesón del gitano (1970) – Jaime
 Os cinco Avisos de Satanás (1970) – Leonardo
 Shango (1970) – Maj. Droster
 Helena y Fernanda (1970)
 ¿Quién soy yo? (1970) – General Varclano
 Viva Cangaceiro (1970) – Governor Branco
 Il tuo dolce corpo da uccidere (1970) – Franz Adler
 Sabata the Killer (1970) – Mangosta
 Apocalypse Joe (1970) – Berg
 Compañeros (1970) – Mexican Colonel
 Trasplante de un cerebro (1970) – Clifton Reynolds
 La araucana (1971) – Virrey Lagasca
 Dead Men Ride (1971) – Redfield
 Il lungo giorno della violenza (1971) – Juan Cisneros 'Malpelo'
 Bad Man's River (1971) – General Duarte
 Delusions of Grandeur (1971) – Gen. Huerta Un Grand d'Espagne
 Long Live Your Death (1971) – Gen. Huerta
 The Two Faces of Fear (1972) – Luisi
 La mansión de la niebla (1972) – Mr. Tremont
 Sonny and Jed (1972) – Don García Moreno
 Knife of Ice (1972) – Marcos
 Fuenteovejuna (1972)
 Sting of the West (1972) – Grant
 What Am I Doing in the Middle of the Revolution? (1972) – Herrero
 La redada (1973) – El Conde
 The Scarlet Letter (1973)
 The Killer with a Thousand Eyes (1973) – Costa
 No es bueno que el hombre esté solo (1973) – Don Alfonso
 Fuzzy the Hero (1973) – Cogan
 The Lonely Woman (1973) – Lawyer
 Ricco the Mean Machine (1973) – Cyrano
 Counselor at Crime (1973) – Calogero Vezza (uncredited)
 Yankee Dudler (1973) – Henry
 The Three Musketeers of the West (1973) – Horatio Maurice DeLuc
 Lisa and the Devil (1973) – Francis Lehar
 La hiena (1973) – Capitán Steven
 Una chica y un señor (1974) – Médico
 El último viaje (1974) – Comisario Mendoza
 ¿... Y el prójimo? (1974) – Vicente
 The Four Musketeers (1974)
 Siete chacales (1974)
 El último proceso en París (1974) – Mr. Dupont
 The Killer Must Kill Again (1975) – Inspector
 Evil Eye (1975) – Walter, the majordomo
 La cruz del diablo (1975) – Enrique Carrillo
 Lisa and the Devil (1975) – Francis Lehar
  (1975) – Dynamite Dick
 Convoy Buddies (1975) – Monsieur Le Renard
 Juego sucio en Panamá (1975) – Edward
 Las adolescentes (1975) – Ana's Father
 Docteur Justice (1975) – Dr. Alverio
 El socarrón (1975)
 Guapa, rica y... especial (1976) – Don Arístides
 La ragazza dalla pelle di corallo (1976) – Barrymore
 Storia di arcieri, pugni e occhi neri (1976) – Baron / Duke of Sherwood
 Lucecita (1976)
 Las marginadas (1977) – Don Fernando
 La llamada del sexo (1977) – Sr. Montero
 El despertar de los sentidos (1977) – Juan
 Espectro (Más allá del fin del mundo) (1978) – Profesor Antón del Valle
 Venus de fuego (1978) – Padre de Alberto
 Polvos mágicos (1979) – Leandro
 The Shark Hunter (1979) – Il capitano Gómez
 Tres mujeres de hoy (1980) – Rafael
 Nightmare City (1980) – Dr. Kramer
 El niño de su mamá (1980) – Enrique
 Buitres sobre la ciudad (1981) – Bonardis
 Asalto al casino (1981) – Director of Security
 El lago de las vírgenes (1982) – Sebastián
 Oasis of the Zombies (1982) – Colonel Kurt Meitzell
 La vida, el amor y la muerte (1982)
 Vatican Conspiracy (1982) – Rettore
 Pájaros de ciudad (1983)
 Hundra (1983) – Chieftain
 Exterminators of the Year 3000 (1983) – Senator
 Yellow Hair and the Fortress of Gold (1984) – Man-Who-Knows
 Café, coca y puro (1985) – Tío de Pablo
 Bangkok, cita con la muerte (1985) – Flanagan
 Mordiendo la vida (1986) – Don Ricardo
 Esto es un atraco (1987) – Ramón
 Fratello dello spazio (1988) – General Bradley

References

External links

 

1924 births
2019 deaths
20th-century Spanish male actors
Spanish male film actors
People from Pontevedra
Male Spaghetti Western actors